"How Do You Know?" is a song recorded by American singer K. Michelle for her second studio album, Anybody Wanna Buy a Heart? (2014). It was released for digital download and streaming on November 17, 2014 by Atlantic Records as the album's first promotional single. "How Do You Know?" lyrics were written by Michelle and Bianca Atterberry and was composed by Timothy Bloom, B.A.M. and Lil' Ronnie. Bloom produced the track, while B.A.M. and Lil' Ronnie served as additional producers. Upon its release of, music critics were positive towards the track, praising Michelle's voice and the lyrics. To promote the single, Michelle performed the song on The Today Show.

Background and composition 
"How Do You Know?" was written by Michelle and Bianca Atterberry and composed by Timothy Bloom, B.A.M. and Lil' Ronnie. The song was produced by Bloom, with additional production by B.A.M. and Ronnie. The track was recorded by C Travis Kr8ts and was mixed by Jaycen Joshua, with assistance from Maddox Chhim and Ryan Kaul. David Kutch mastered "How Do You Know?". "How Do You Know?" was released for digital download and streaming as the first promotional single from Anybody Wanna Buy a Heart? on November 17, 2014 by Atlantic Records. Musically, "How Do You Know?" has been described as a soulful ballad. Lyrically, the song finds a vulnerable Michelle singing about moving on from a past relationship and finding love again. According to the sheet music published at Musicnotes.com by Sony/ATV Music Publishing, the song is performed in the key of Db Major with a vocal range of Ab3-Db5 and a moderately slow tempo of 63 beats per minute. Michelle's vocals span from to F2 to B3.

Critical reception 
Rap-Up wrote about the song, sayingː "On the impassioned piano ballad, the Memphis songstress tries to move on from the past and find love again, but she has her doubts.". Lloyd Jaffe from HotNewHipHop said that the track "wears its heart on its sleeve". Vixen of Vibe compared the song to Michelle's two other songs from her album, "Love 'Em All" and "Maybe I Should Call" and stated that the song "operates on a piano melody and Michelle's voice, her doing a dance in her head of whether or not her man was the one who caused her the pain". Bradley Stern from Idolator considered that Michelle said "For anyone hoping to hear Miss K. Michelle showcasing her powerhouse chops, this one ought to satisfy." and praised "her irresistible high-pitched vocals and emotional lyrics stand out the most in the piano-driven ballad". During a review for Anybody Wanna Buy a Heart? for PopMatters, Devone Jones said that the song is "probably one of the most dull ballads in recent memory due to the fact that everything is wrong" and said that it sounded like a "failed Mariah moment that had too much effort put into it".

Credits and personnel 
Credits were adapted from the liner notes from Anybody Wanna Buy A Heart?

 Kimberly Pate – lyricist
 Bianca Atterberry – lyricist
 Timothy Bloom – production, music
 B.A.M. – additional production, music
 Ronnie "Lil Ronnie" Jackson – additional production, music

 C Travis Kr8ts – recording
 Jaycen Joshua – mixing
 Maddox Chhim – mixing assistantance
 Ryan Kaul – mixing assistantance
 David Kutch – mastering

References

External links
 

K. Michelle songs
2010s ballads
2014 songs
2014 singles
Atlantic Records singles
Songs written by K. Michelle
Songs written by Bianca Atterberry